Stenoporpia vernata is a species of moth in the family Geometridae. It was described by William Barnes and James Halliday McDunnough in 1910 and is found in North America.

The MONA or Hodges number for Stenoporpia vernata is 6465.

References

 Scoble, Malcolm J., ed. (1999). Geometrid Moths of the World: A Catalogue (Lepidoptera, Geometridae), 1016.

Further reading

External links

 Butterflies and Moths of North America

Boarmiini